McNutts Island is a community  in the Canadian province of Nova Scotia, located in the Shelburne municipal district of Shelburne County.

History
The island was named after Col. Alexander McNutt, who lived here in the late 1760s.

During World War II, a battery of two 10 inch M1888 guns were built on the island. It was abandoned in 1945 after the war ended, but the guns remain in place until today. However, the island wasn't abandoned in 1945 because there were a few families who lived there during and after the war.

See also
 List of communities in Nova Scotia

References

External links
 McNutts Island on Destination Nova Scotia

Communities in Shelburne County, Nova Scotia
Populated coastal places in Canada